

This is a list of the National Register of Historic Places listings in Lycoming County, Pennsylvania.

This is intended to be a complete list of the properties and districts on the National Register of Historic Places in Lycoming County, Pennsylvania, United States.  The locations of National Register properties and districts for which the latitude and longitude coordinates are included below, may be seen in a map.

There are 21 properties and districts listed on the National Register in the county.

Current listings

|}

Former listing

|}

See also

List of National Historic Landmarks in Pennsylvania
National Register of Historic Places listings in Pennsylvania
List of Pennsylvania state historical markers in Lycoming County

References

 
Lycoming County